"Before I Lay (You Drive Me Crazy)" is a 1996 song by American musician CeCe Peniston, released as a duet with JoJo Hailey of Jodeci. The single was released as the second single from the singer's third and final studio album, I'm Movin' On (1996). It peaked at number fifty-two on the US Billboard R&B chart, while reaching number twenty-one on the Billboard Bubbling Under Hot 100 Singles chart (a virtual equivalent to number 121 on the Billboard Hot 100).

Critical reception
Peter Miro from Cash Box wrote, "Hailey makes a strong statement when paired with house diva Peniston, here flexing her soulful capabilities in a steamy situation that should make for an urban radio mainstay in key markets. Approaches the chemistry of K Ci's duet with Mary J. Blige three years ago, and has party slow jam written all over it for close-clinging baptisms of fire."

Credits and personnel

 CeCe Peniston – lead/back vocal
 Joel Hailey – lead/back vocal, lyrics, producer
 Daryl Pearson – music, co-producer, additional musician, programming
 Gerald Baillergeau – remix
 Victor Merritt – remix
 Craig Nobles – remix coordinator
 John Wydrycs – engineer
 John Pace – mix
 Manny Lehman – executive producer
 Damon Jones – executive producer
 Greg Ross – design
 Daniela Federici – photography

Additional credits
 "House Party" 
 "Movin' On" 
 "Finally"

Track listings and formats

Double A-side

 12", US, Promo, #AMPRO 00342
 "Before I Lay" (LP Version) – 4:47
 "House Party" (LP Version) – 4:11
 "House Party" (Instrumental Version) – 4:12
 "Movin' On" (East Coast Flava Mix with Rap) – 4:02
 "Movin' On" (East Coast Flava Mix – Instrumental) – 4:01
 "House Party" (Acappella) – 3:57

A and B-side
 CS, US, #31458 2004 4
 CD, US, #31458 2004 2
 "Before I Lay" (Radio Edit with Intro) – 4:16
 "Movin' On" (East Coast Flava Mix with Rap) – 4:02

 MCD, US, #31458 2005 2
 "Before I Lay" (Radio Edit with Intro) – 4:16
 "Before I Lay" (LP Version) – 4:47
 "Movin' On" (East Coast Flava Mix with Rap) – 4:02
 "Finally" (12" Choice Mix) – 7:04

 MCD, US, Promo, #AMSAD 00338
 "Before I Lay" (Radio Edit with Intro) – 4:16
 "Before I Lay" (LP Version) – 4:47
 "Before I Lay" (Radio Edit without Intro) – 4:17
 "Before I Lay" (Instrumental) – 4:48

 MCD, US, Promo, #AMSAD 00369
 "Before I Lay" (Radio Remix) – 4:10
 "Before I Lay" (Grand Jury Mix) – 4:02
 "Before I Lay" (Back of the Room Mix) – 4:08
 "Before I Lay" (LP Version) – 4:47

 12", US, #AMPRO 00371
 "Before I Lay" (Radio Remix) – 4:10
 "Before I Lay" (Grand Jury Mix) – 4:02
 "Before I Lay" (Back of the Room Mix) – 4:08
 "Before I Lay" (Radio Remix Instrumental) – 4:04
 "Before I Lay" (Grand Jury Mix Instrumental) – 4:05
 "Before I Lay" (Back of the Room Mix Instrumental) – 4:09
 "Before I Lay" (LP Version) – 4:47

Charts

References

General

 Specific

External links
 
 

1996 singles
1996 songs
CeCe Peniston songs
Songs written by Darryl Pearson (musician)